The J-Bay Open 2016 was an event of the Association of Surfing Professionals for 2016 World Surf League.

This event was held from 6 to 17 July at Jeffreys Bay, (Eastern Cape, South Africa) and opposed by 36 surfers.

The tournament was won by Mick Fanning (AUS), who beat John Florence (HAW) in final.

Round 1

Round 2

Round 3

Round 4

Round 5

Quarter finals

Semi finals

Final

References

J-Bay Open
2016 World Surf League